The siege of Nisibis took place when the Sasanians under Shah Shapur I besieged the Roman city of Nisibis in 252. This marks the beginning of Shapur's I second invasion of the Roman empire which saw the first Sassanid invasion of Syria; the year of the invasion is debated as Shapur's inscription from Naqsh-e Rustam regarding his second campaign against Rome do not mention the city of Nisibis. But Syriac and Arabic sources, mainly the Chronicle of Seert and Al-Tabari, mention that Shapur took Nisibis in his eleventh regnal year; according to the historian David Stone Potter, this regnal year is 252. Another Syriac account, the Liber Caliphorum, from the eighth century, mentions the invasion of the city in 252.

References

Citations

Sources

Nisibis 252
Nisibis 252
Nisibis 252
Nisibis 252
Nisibis 252
Nisibis 252
Nisibis 252
Sieges of Nisibis